Zsanett Jakabfi (born 18 February 1990 in Lengyeltóti) is a former Hungarian footballer, who played for VfL Wolfsburg in Germany's Frauen-Bundesliga.

Career
She previously played for MTK Hungária in Hungary's Női NB I. Jakabfi announced she will retire at the end of the 2020/21 bundesliga season. Jakabfi is a member of the Hungarian national team since 2007.

International goals

Titles

MTK Hungária
 Hungarian Women's League: Winner 2005

VfL Wolfsburg
Bundesliga: Winner 2012–13,  2013–14, 2016–17, 2017–18, 2018–19, 2019–20
UEFA Women's Champions League: Winner 2012–13, 2013–14
DFB-Pokal: Winner 2012–13, 2014–15, 2015–16, 2016–17, 2017–18, 2018–19, 2019–20, 2020–21

References

1990 births
Living people
Hungarian women's footballers
Hungary women's international footballers
MTK Hungária FC (women) players
VfL Wolfsburg (women) players
Expatriate women's footballers in Germany
Hungarian expatriate sportspeople in Germany
People from Lengyeltóti
Women's association football midfielders
Women's association football forwards
Sportspeople from Somogy County
Frauen-Bundesliga players